The flag of Nicaragua was first adopted on September 4, 1908, but not made official until August 27, 1971. It is based on, and inspired by, the flag of the Federal Republic of Central America and flag of Argentina.

It is one of only three national flags (the others being El Salvador and Dominica) that currently use purple.

Overview
The two Azure bands on the flag and the arms of Nicaragua in use today is derived from that of the United Provinces of Central America. The triangle, volcanoes, rising sun, Cap of Liberty, and rainbow all appeared on the original emblem. The coat of arms used today contains the name of the state, Republica de Nicaragua, whereas in 1823 the title was Provincias Unidas del Centro de America. The decision to revert to the emblems used by the United Provinces of Central America was taken in 1908 and reflected Nicaragua's aspirations for the rebirth of the political entity formed by the 5 nations. Except for the text around the arms, the flag is very similar to that of the United Provinces of Central America. The 5 volcanoes represent the original 5 member states, the Cap of Liberty represents national freedom, and the rays of the sun and the rainbow are symbolic of the bright future to come.

The presence of a rainbow in the coat of arms makes the flag of Nicaragua one of only three flags of a sovereign state to include the color purple, alongside the flag of Dominica and the flag of El Salvador.

Historical flags

See also
List of Nicaraguan flags
Coat of arms of Nicaragua

References

External links

Flags introduced in 1908
Flags introduced in 1971
National flags
National symbols of Nicaragua